is a Japanese football player who currently plays for Zweigen Kanazawa.

Playing career
Otani was born in Ishikawa Prefecture on January 17, 1997. He joined J3 League club Kataller Toyama in 2018.

References

External links

1997 births
Living people
Kanazawa Gakuin University alumni
Association football people from Ishikawa Prefecture
Japanese footballers
J3 League players
Kataller Toyama players
Association football forwards